Chickies Ridge is a long ridge in West Hempfield Township, Lancaster County, Pennsylvania, terminating at the west end in an outcropping overlooking the Susquehanna River, known as Chickies Rock.

Geology

Part of an eastward extension of the Hellam Hills, Chickies Ridge has been separated from them by a water gap cut by the Susquehanna. The ridge is composed of uplifted Cambrian Chickies Formation, which extends several miles east before merging into the surrounding uplands. Chickies Rock, at the west end overlooking the river, is the largest exposed anticline on the East Coast. According to the USGS, the summit of the ridge is 587 feet (179 m) above sea level.

Chickies Creek runs along the north side of the ridge towards the western end, while Jones Run runs along the south side towards the western end.

History

 	
The name of the creek comes from the Lenape "Chiquesalunga", meaning "place of crayfish".

Chickies Hill Road appears to have been the earliest road over the ridge, switchbacking across the middle and making a steep descent down the northern side on the way from Columbia to Marietta.

During the Gettysburg Campaign of the American Civil War, Chickies Rock served as a Union army observation post during the Confederate occupation of Wrightsville across the river.

The Columbia and Donegal Electric Railway built tracks up the side of the ridge from Columbia in 1893. This was an amusement park built by the trolley company on the west end of the ridge,  atop Chickies Rock, overlooking the Susquehanna. The line to the park was opened on July 1, 1893. This extension was opened on December 31, 1893. The trolley line was abandoned on April 25, 1932.

Pennsylvania Route 441 once followed Chickies Hill Road, but a later realignment brought it directly through the western part of Chickies Ridge in a deep cut, substantially reducing the climb.

The Pennsylvania Canal, the Columbia Branch and then the Atglen and Susquehanna Branch of the Pennsylvania Railroad all at different times squeezed between Chickies Rock and the river. All but the last are now abandoned.

A variation of Shakespeare's Romeo and Juliet is told, with an Indian Maiden replacing Juliet and a white settler as Romeo. Eventually, the settler is killed in a war over the maiden, who throws herself off Chickies Rock.

Trails and recreation
Chickies Rock is a popular venue for rock climbing. The ridge to the west of Chickies Hill Road is part of Chickies Rock Park, owned by Lancaster County. The Chickies Rock Overlook Trail leads from parking along Route 441 to the top of Chickies Rock, roughly following the old trolley grade. The Clayton Shenk trail crosses Jones Run and climbs up the south side of the ridge east of Route 441, dropping down the north side to Chickies Hill Road.

Botany
Chickies Rock is a host site for one of the rarest of eastern U.S. ferns, Bradley's spleenwort.

References

Climbing areas of the United States
Landforms of Lancaster County, Pennsylvania
Ridges of Pennsylvania
Tourist attractions in Lancaster County, Pennsylvania